McCrossin is a surname of Scottish origin. It is similar to McCrossan.

List of people with the surname 

 Elizabeth Smith-McCrossin (born 1969), Canadian politician
 Julie McCrossin (born 1954), Australian radio broadcaster, journalist, comedian, political commentator

See also 

 McCrossins Mill

Surnames
Scottish surnames
Surnames of Scottish origin
Surnames of British Isles origin